Barbara Shelley (born Barbara Teresa Kowin; 13 February 1932 – 3 January 2021) was an English film and television actress. She appeared in more than a hundred films and television series. She was particularly known for her work in horror films, notably Village of the Damned; Dracula, Prince of Darkness; Rasputin, the Mad Monk and Quatermass and the Pit.

Biography
Shelley was born in London, England, on 13 February 1932. Her parents were May (née Hayes) and Robert Kowin. She had an older sister, Jo, who emigrated to Canada to become a writer and producer for CBC Television. Shelley attended a convent in Harlesden, north London, where she performed in Gilbert and Sullivan productions and school plays, as well as participating in local Catholic youth drama festivals. Initially shy on stage, her acting teacher suggested that she take up modelling to gain self-confidence. Shelley followed the advice and started modelling in 1951, which led to an offer of a minor role as a fashion show commentator in the 1953 Hammer Film Productions film Mantrap. She was credited for this film under her birth name, Barbara Kowin. The same year, she went to Rome on holiday and met Italian comic actor Walter Chiari, who recognised her talent and suggested she change her name to that of his favourite poet, Shelley. Although she had planned a month's holiday, Shelley lived in Rome for four years and appeared in nine Italian films, speaking Italian.

Horror films

Shelley returned to the UK in 1957, starring that year in the film Cat Girl for British Lion Films. The following year she made her first significant appearance in a film for Hammer, The Camp on Blood Island. She then appeared in the gothic horror Blood of the Vampire (1958), distributed by Eros Films, and later took a number of roles in horror features, including Village of the Damned (1960) for MGM-British, and The Gorgon (1964), Dracula, Prince of Darkness (1966), Rasputin, the Mad Monk (1966) and Quatermass and the Pit (1967) for Hammer. She became the company's top female star and was nicknamed the "Queen of Hammer". Her final role on screen was in the Uncle Silas mini series in 1989.

Ryan Gilbey, in her obituary in The Guardian, praises Shelley's acting in the Hammer films, considering that she had "a grounded, rational quality that instantly conferred gravitas on whatever lunatic occurrences were unfolding around her." In Dracula, Prince of Darkness she starred opposite Christopher Lee, portraying a virtuous woman who reveals to her friend that she has been turned into a vampire in a scene which Gilbey describes as having "traumatised and tantalised" viewers. Shelley considered the later scene in that film in which her character is staked to be among her best work. In Village of the Damned – based on John Wyndham's science fiction novel, The Midwich Cuckoos – she gave a "heartbreaking" performance as one of the mothers of the alien children. In Quatermass and the Pit, she plays a scientist who is taken over by an alien spacecraft, in a scene described by Gilbey as "painfully believable". Although she is known as a scream queen, her most famous scream (in Dracula) was dubbed by co-star Suzan Farmer. In 2010, writer and actor Mark Gatiss interviewed Shelley about her career at Hammer for his BBC documentary series A History of Horror.

While making the 1961 TV film, A Story of David, she met Hollywood star Jeff Chandler, and they began a relationship. Chandler died suddenly the following year. Shelley is later reported to have said that he had been the love of her life.

Television and stage work
Shelley's television appearances include the first Danger Man episode, "View from a Villa" (1960), plus a subsequent episode that season, "The Traitor" (also 1960); The Saint (1962); "Death Trap" an episode in the Edgar Wallace Mysteries series, (1962); an episode of The New Phil Silvers Show (1963); The Man from U.N.C.L.E. (1965); two episodes of 12 O'Clock High (1965 and 1966); The Avengers episodes "Dragonsfield" (1961) and "From Venus with Love" (1967); Crown Court (1972); Z-Cars (1973); the television series Prince Regent (1979); the BBC TV adaptation of Pride and Prejudice (1980) as Mrs Gardiner (the Bennet sisters' aunt); The Borgias (1981); the Blake's 7 episode "Stardrive" (1981); the Bergerac Series 2 episode "A Perfect Recapture" (1983); the Doctor Who serial Planet of Fire (1984), and EastEnders (1988).

Shelley also acted in the Royal Shakespeare Company from 1975 to 1977. She retired in 1988.

Death
Shelley was admitted to hospital in December 2020, for a check-up. It was there she contracted COVID-19 during the COVID-19 pandemic in England. Though Shelley recovered, she fell ill with other underlying health conditions. She died on 3 January 2021, at the age of 88.

Selected filmography

Films 

 Mantrap (1953) (as Barbara Kowin)
 New Moon (1955) as Amira
 Destinazione Piovarolo (1955)
 I quattro del getto tonante (1955)
 Motivo in maschera (1955)
 Lacrime di sposa (1955) as Barbara Flam
 Tragic Ballad (1955) as Betty Mason
 Nero's Mistress (1956)
 Toto, Peppino and the Outlaws (1956) as La Baronessa
 Supreme Confession (1956) as Bettina
 Cat Girl (1957) as Leonora Johnson - née Brandt
 The End of the Line (1957) as Liliane
 The Camp on Blood Island (1958) as Kate
 Blood of the Vampire (1958) as Madeleine
 The Solitary Child (1958) as Harriet
 Deadly Record (1959) as Susan Webb
 Murder at Site 3 (1958) as Susan
 Bobbikins (1959) as Valerie
 Village of the Damned (1960) as Anthea Zellaby
 A Story of David (1961) as Abigail
 Shadow of the Cat (1961) as Beth Venable
 Postman's Knock (1962) as Jean
 Edgar Wallace Mysteries episode: Death Trap (1962) as Jean Anscomb
 Stranglehold (1963) as Chris Morrison
 The Gorgon (1964) as Carla Hoffman
 Blind Corner (1964) as Anne
 The Secret of Blood Island (1965) as Elaine
 Dracula, Prince of Darkness (1966) as Helen
 Rasputin, the Mad Monk (1966) as Sonia
 Quatermass and the Pit (1967) (US title: Five Million Years to Earth) as Barbara Judd
 Ghost Story (1974) as Matron

Television series 
 The Spy Killer (1969, TV Movie) as Danielle
 Justice (1974) "Point of Death" - Aisling Ainsworth
 The Comedy of Errors (1978, TV Movie) as Courtesan
 The Borgias (1981) as Vannozza Canale
 Maigret (1988, TV Movie) as Louise Maigret
 The Dark Angel (1991) as Cousin Monica

References

External links

Barbara Shelley at HorrorStars
BFI profile

1932 births
2021 deaths
20th-century English actresses
Actresses from London
English film actresses
English television actresses
People from Marylebone
Deaths from the COVID-19 pandemic in England